Mohamed Youssef (born 17 November 1956) is an Egyptian weightlifter. He competed in the men's featherweight event at the 1984 Summer Olympics.

References

1956 births
Living people
Egyptian male weightlifters
Olympic weightlifters of Egypt
Weightlifters at the 1984 Summer Olympics
Place of birth missing (living people)
20th-century Egyptian people